This is a list of the Top 100 cities in Mexico by fixed population, according to the 2020 Mexican National Census.

According to Mexico's National Institute of Statistics and Geography (INEGI), a locality is "any place settled with one or more dwellings, which may or may not be inhabited, and which is known by a name given by law or tradition". Urban localities are those with more than 2,500 residents, which can be designated as cities, villages or towns according to the laws of each state. The National Urban System, compiled by the National Population Council (CONAPO) in 2018, identifies 401 urban localities in Mexico with more than 15,000 residents as "cities".

This list does not consider the entire population of metropolitan areas and is limited by political boundaries within each municipality or state. To see the full cities of Mexico go to Metropolitan areas of Mexico.

Top 100 cities by population 
Only one state (Tlaxcala) has no cities in the Top 100. Mexico City contains all of the federal entity's area, including rural areas with relatively small populations. All of the map links are of the same scale.

‡ These cities extend beyond the borders of a single municipality.

Distribution
For the Top 100 cities, the following distributions hold as of the 2020 Census. 

The total population is 57,930,969, 45.97% of Mexico's total.

The mean city population is 579,310. The median city in population is Villahermosa.

The mean city growth from 2010 to 2020 is 20.77%, compared to a national growth of 12.17%. The median city in population growth is Ixtapaluca.

See also
 List of most populous cities in Mexico by decade
 List of municipalities in Mexico by population
 Metropolitan areas of Mexico
 Demographics of Mexico

References

External links

 National Population Council (CONAPO) — official website. 
 National Institute of Statistics and Geography (INEGI)  — official website. 
 Main Cities to Visit in Mexico — 
 Towns of Mexico — List with all the small villages, towns and cities in Mexico

 

Mexico
Mexico
Cities
Mexico
Subdivisions of Mexico